Chaudhary Pratap Singh Daulta (born 13 April 1918)  was an Indian politician and leader of Communist Party of India. He represented Jhajjar - Rewari constituency in 2nd Lok Sabha.

He was previously associated with Unionist Party. He imprisoned a number of times in connection with Kisan movements.

Position Held
Vice-President Punjab Kisan Sabha, 1953–55; 
President, Punjab Young Zamindara Association, 1943

References

Communist Party of India politicians from Haryana
India MPs 1957–1962